The 2018–19 DHB-Pokal was the 43rd edition of the tournament.

THW Kiel won the cup for the eleventh time.

Format
The first round was split in a north and a south part and played in mini tournaments where only the winner advanced to the round of 16. From there on a knockout system was used to determine the winner. The final four was played on one weekend in Hamburg.

Round 1
The draw was held on 19 June 2018. The matches were played on 18 and 19 August 2018 with a semifinal and final. The winner of each tournament advanced to the round of 16.

|-
|colspan=3 style="text-align:center;" |North
|-
|colspan=3 style="text-align:center;" |Göttingen

|-
|colspan=3 style="text-align:center;" |Spenge

|-
|colspan=3 style="text-align:center;" |Wilhelmshaven

|-
|colspan=3 style="text-align:center;" |Altenholz

|-
|colspan=3 style="text-align:center;" |Halver

|-
|colspan=3 style="text-align:center;" |Emsdetten

|-
|colspan=3 style="text-align:center;" |Neustadt

|-
|colspan=3 style="text-align:center;" |Hildesheim

|}

|-
|colspan=3 style="text-align:center;" |South
|-
|colspan=3 style="text-align:center;" |Fürstenfeldbruck

|-
|colspan=3 style="text-align:center;" |Kornwestheim

|-
|colspan=3 style="text-align:center;" |Weilheim/Teck

|-
|colspan=3 style="text-align:center;" |Melsungen

|-
|colspan=3 style="text-align:center;" |Hanau

|-
|colspan=3 style="text-align:center;" |Lößnitz

|-
|colspan=3 style="text-align:center;" |Heilbronn

|-
|colspan=3 style="text-align:center;" |Pfullingen

|}

Round of 16
The draw was held on 22 August 2018. The match from Berlin was moved forward to 16 September due to their involvement in the 2018 IHF Super Globe, the other matches will be played on 16 and 17 October 2018.

Quarterfinals
The draw was held on 18 October 2018. The matches will be played on 27 November and 18 and 19 December 2018.

Final four
The draw was held on 8 January 2019. The matches were played on 6 and 7 April 2019.

Bracket

Semifinals

Final

References

External links
Official website

2019